Kigga is a small village located at a distance of 9 km from Sringeri in Chikmagalur district. The main attraction of Kigga is Sri Rishya Shringeshwara temple (Rishya Shringa). Another attraction of Kigga is Narasimha Parvatha, the tallest peak in the Agumbe Ghats. Sirimane waterfall is located nearby Kigga.

References

Villages in Chikkamagaluru district